ABSA Bank (Mauritius) Limited is a Commercial bank in Mauritius, it is part of Absa Group Limited. Mr Ravin Rao Dajee is currently the Managing Director.

History
In 1925, National Bank of South Africa was merged with the Anglo-Egyptian Bank and the Colonial Bank in 1925 to form Barclays Bank (Dominion, Colonial and Overseas). This brought the Mauritian operations under Barclays Bank. In 2002, Barclays Bank Mauritius bought Banque Nationale de Paris Intercontinentale (BNPI). This acquisition brought with it six branches to add to Barclays' existing 13 branches.

The Bank operated as a branch of Barclays Bank Plc until 1 June 2013 when it was locally incorporated as Barclays Bank Mauritius Limited ("BBML"). On 10 February 2020, the Bank of Mauritius announced the cancelling of Barclays Bank Mauritius Limited's licence and that a new banking licence issued for the company in its new name Absa Bank (Mauritius) Limited.

See also
Absa Bank Mauritius Limited
List of banks in Mauritius
List of banks in Africa

References

Absa Group Limited